Ivan Sergeyevich Babikov; born July 4, 1980 in Syktyvkar) is a Russian-born Canadian cross-country skier who competed between 2002 and 2016. At the 2010 Winter Olympics in Whistler, he earned his best finish of fifth in the 15km + 15km double pursuit, and was fourth in 2013 World Championship 15 km freestyle, representing Canada.

He was raised in Kozhva,Pechora Region, Komi Republic) and studied at Syktyvkar State University Sport faculty (1997–2004).

Skiing
Babikov immigrated to Canada in the spring of 2003, as he and his mother joined his sister, who had moved to this country in 1998, in the Toronto area. Initially, Babikov had no intentions of skiing after his career had stalled in Russia. But that fall he moved to Canmore and began competing with the Canadian team, but with a Russian license from the International Skiing Federation (FIS). Without Canadian citizenship, however, he chose to return to Russia and was selected to compete for that country at the 2006 Olympic Winter Games. He continued to compete for Russia in 2006-07 after a bid to fast-track his Canadian citizenship was unsuccessful.

By this time, Babikov was determined to make his home in Canada, especially after his mother was granted her citizenship. Midway through the 2007-08 season, Babikov also officially became Canadian and began representing the maple leaf internationally in 2008-09. In January 2009 he finished first in the final stage of the Tour de Ski, becoming just the second Canadian man (and still just one of four) to win a World Cup race. It was the first World Cup victory by a Canadian man since Pierre Harvey in March 1988.

Babikov was part of the home team at Vancouver 2010, where the men’s cross-country team posted several unprecedented results. In the event now known as the 30 km skiathlon, Babikov placed a Canadian best-ever fifth in a race in which three Canadians were in the top-10. He also finished a best-ever eighth in the 15 km freestyle race and helped the 4 × 10 km relay team to a seventh place finish.

Babikov has 33 individual career victories up to 50 km at lesser events from 2003 to 2006.

He competed in 2006 Winter Olympics for Russia (he was 13th in 30 km skiathlon) and in the 2010 Winter Olympics in Vancouver, Canada, finishing seventh in the 4 × 10 km relay. In Vancouver he showed his best personal Olympic results: He was fifth in the skiathlon and eighth in 15 km freestyle.

He announced his retirement from cross-country skiing in June, 2016 and joined the coaching staff of the Canadian National Cross-Country Ski Team.

Change of nationality
Babikov lived in Canada in spring 2003 on a sponsorship, and got his Canadian citizenship in December 2007. In 2008, he still had to ski for Russia, according to rules about the licenses from International Ski Federation. He officially became a Canadian ski competitor in January 2009. Now he lives in Alberta.

Cross-country skiing results
All results are sourced from the International Ski Federation (FIS).

Olympic Games

World Championships

World Cup

Season standings

Individual podiums
1 victory – (1 )
3 podiums – (3 )

Team podiums

 1 victory – (1 )
 1 podium – (1 )

References

External links
 
 
 
 2009 Interview with Ivan Babikov

1980 births
Living people
People from Syktyvkar
Canadian male cross-country skiers
Canadian people of Komi descent
Canadian people of Russian descent
Cross-country skiers at the 2006 Winter Olympics
Cross-country skiers at the 2010 Winter Olympics
Cross-country skiers at the 2014 Winter Olympics
Naturalized citizens of Canada
Olympic cross-country skiers of Canada
Olympic cross-country skiers of Russia
Tour de Ski skiers
Russian emigrants to Canada
Sportspeople from Alberta
Sportspeople from the Komi Republic